Brecksville Reservation is the largest urban park in the U.S. state of Ohio. Chippewa Creek flows through the  reservation, which is home to a section of the Buckeye Trail. The park supports a diverse set of ecosystems, featuring fields, a river plain, gorges, and a variety of forested areas.

References

Parks in Ohio